The Ministry of Foreign Affairs of the Republic of Indonesia or commonly known by its abbreviation Kemlu, is an Indonesian government ministry responsible for the country's foreign politics and diplomacy. The ministry was formerly known as the Department of Foreign Affairs (abbreviated as Deplu) until 2008 when the nomenclature changed with the enactment of the 2008 State Ministry Act.

Ministry of Foreign Affairs is one of three ministries, along with Ministry of Defense and Ministry Home Affairs, that is explicitly mentioned in the Constitution of Indonesia, hence the president has no authority to dissolve the ministry.

According to Article 8 of the Constitution, in case that both the president and the vice president can no longer serve at the same time, the line of succession temporarily falls to a troika of minister of foreign affairs, minister of home affairs, and minister of defense who would govern concurrently until the succeeding President and Vice President are elected by the People's Consultative Assembly within thirty days of the posts' vacancy.

Since October 2014, Retno Marsudi has served as Minister of Foreign Affairs, succeeding Marty Natalegawa.

History
The Ministry of Foreign Affairs was founded in 1945 following the Proclamation of Indonesian Independence from the Netherlands. The headquarters was initially located in the garage of the country's first Minister of Foreign Affairs, Achmad Soebardjo, at Jl. Cikini 80–82 in Jakarta. The Ministry started with just six employees, including Hadi Thayeb.

First five years (1945-1950) 
During the first five years of the Ministry's existence, the supreme task was to gain overseas recognition and international sympathy of Indonesian struggle for independence, all while during ongoing armed conflict with the Dutch colonial forces.

The young government managed to held peace talks and conferences with several parties, such as at Linggadjati (1946) or onboard USS Renville (1948). It actively supported high-level meeting such as the Round Table Conference (1949), where Indonesian independence was finally acknowledged by the Netherlands.

Liberal Democracy Period (1950-1959) 
During this period, Indonesian diplomatic corps further pursued international recognition for Indonesia. It successfully managed to apply for Indonesian membership in the United Nations (1950), hosted a high-level conference of Asian and African countries in Bandung (1955), conclude an important nationality agreement with People's Republic of China (1955), and abandoned Dutch-Indonesian Union in 1956.

Despite some successes in other subjects, the New Guinea Question as the most important diplomacy goal remained unresolved throughout this period.

Guided Democracy Period (1959-1966) 
Sukarno's disappointment with what he perceived as weakness of western-style parliamentary democracy, led him to restore Indonesia's 1945 presidential constitution. Along with it was a shift in Indonesian foreign policy, where Indonesia pursued a closer relations with the Soviet Union, People's Republic of China, and the Eastern Bloc in general; Although Indonesia would also participate in the foundation of the Non-Aligned Movement in Belgrade (1961). It also demanded a resolution on Dutch continued presence and occupation in the Western New Guinea, where Indonesia would consider a military approach in order to assert Indonesian rights over the territory. Dutch presence on the island would end following the New York Agreement (1962), where the Dutch New Guinea administration will transfer from the Netherlands to the United Nations Temporary Executive Authority (UNTEA), then to Indonesia.

Following the formation of Malaya, Singapore, Sabah, and North Borneo (Sabah) into the Federation of Malaysia (1963), Indonesia entered into a period of low-level confrontation with Malaysia, citing British imperialism in the region. Also during this period, Indonesia would suspend its membership in the United Nations, the only country to do so. The Konfrontasi would last until 1966, when the Sukarno administration was replaced, with Suharto became head of government, later President.

New Order Period (1966-1998) 
Under Suharto, many of foreign policy overtures under Sukarno was revamped. The "Free-and-Active" foreign policy was reconfirmed, although at the cost of relations with many communist countries; no formal diplomatic relations between Indonesia and the PRC existed until 1990.

Suharto's militarist administration would held a referendum in West New Guinea to fulfill a requirement regarding the transfer of administration. Although the Act of Free Choice (1969) was highly suspected to be held under threat of violence by the Indonesian military, the result was unanimous in support of Indonesian integration, and was accepted and adopted by the UN General Assembly in November 1969.

Another one of this period's diplomatic activities is the formation of ASEAN in 1967, following the conclusion of Bangkok Declaration by the delegates of Indonesia, Malaysia, Singapore, Thailand, and the Philippines. Indonesian government would also continue active participation in the Non-Aligned Movement and the Asia-Pacific Economic Cooperation, becoming its chairman for multiple times.

In 1975, Indonesia would invade and occupy East Timor until 1999. Throughout the New Order period, Indonesian foreign policy would promote and gain international recognition for the eventual annexation of East Timor.

Indonesia would also actively promote compliance of existing international law of the sea as prescribed under the UNCLOS, where Indonesia heavily contributed  in the newly created 'archipelagic states' concept.

Present day (1998-now) 
Present-day Indonesian foreign policy was the reconfirmation of 'Free-and-Active' foreign policy.

Habibie Administration allowed a referendum to be conducted in East Timor, whether they prefer autonomy in Indonesia or independence.

Indonesia was invited into the Group of 20, as the only Southeast Asian countries in the group. In 2022, Indonesia held the G20 presidency with the topic 'Recover Together, Recover Stronger'.

Duties and responsibilities

The Ministry of Foreign Affairs have statutory responsibilities for Indonesian foreign policy. The head of the Ministry of Foreign Affairs, the Minister of Foreign Affairs, is the President's principal foreign policy advisor. The Ministry advances Indonesian objectives and interests in the world through its primary role in developing and implementing the President's foreign policy. It also provides important services to Indonesian citizens and to foreigners seeking to visit Indonesia. All activities—bilateral programs, consular affairs, Indonesian representation abroad—are paid for by the budget, which represents a little more than 0.30% of the total government budget.

According to Foreign Ministerial Regulation No. 9/2021 concerning the Organization and Management of the Ministry of Foreign Affairs, its purpose includes:
 Formulation, policy-making, and implementation of policies in regard to foreign relations and policies;
Coordination of foreign relations and politics in regard to government institutions;
Formulation, drafting, and providing recommendations in regard to implementing strategic foreign policies and politics; 
Coordination of responsibilities, fostering, and administrative support within the Ministry as well as the Missions abroad;
 Management of state property and wealth which constitute part of the responsibility of the Ministry and Missions;
 Supervision of the execution of duties of the Ministry and the Missions;
Substantive support within the Ministry; and
Other functions and responsibilities as tasked by the President.
The Foreign Ministry advances Indonesian foreign policy by promoting (1) 'Maritime diplomacy and strong border'; (2) 'Advancing Indonesian leadership in ASEAN'; (3) 'Advancing Indonesian role in the international community'; (4) 'Stronger economic diplomacy'; (5) 'Prime service and protection of Indonesian citizens, legal entities, and Indonesian Diaspora'; (6) 'Enhanced foreign policy'; (7) 'Significant national support and commitment for foreign policy and international agreements'; and (8) 'Monitoring efficient diplomatic results.

Organization 
The Minister of Foreign Affairs is the head of the Ministry of Foreign Affairs and a member of the Cabinet that answers directly to, and advises, the President of the Republic of Indonesia on matters of Indonesian foreign policy and foreign relations. The minister organizes and supervises the Ministry and its entire staff, included the overseas missions. As of 2020, the Ministry of Foreign Affairs has 3,349 Civil Service employees.

The Ministry is organized into the following structure:

Executives 

 Minister of Foreign Affairs, who heads the Ministry; and
 Deputy Minister of Foreign Affairs, who assists the Minister in (i) formulating and implementing Indonesian foreign policy, and (ii) coordinating all high-level strategic activities of the Ministry.

Secretariat 
Secretariat General, tasked with coordinating the Ministry workflow, organizational fostering, and providing administrative support within the Ministry. The Secretariat General oversees several bureaus, as follows:
Bureau of Executive Strategic Support;
Bureau of Law and Administration of Ministry and Missions;
Bureau of Planning and Organization;
Bureau of Human Resource;
Bureau of Finance; and
Bureau of General Affairs.

Directorates General 
Directorate General of Asia-Pacific and African Affairs, tasked with formulating and implementing Indonesian foreign policy in the form of bilateral, intraregional, and interregional interests in the region of Asia-Pacific and Africa. The DG oversees several subsections, as follows:
DG Secretariat;
Directorate of Southeast Asian Affairs;
Directorate of East Asian Affairs;
Directorate of Pacific and Oceanian Affairs;
Directorate of South and Central Asian Affairs;
Directorate of Middle-Eastern Affairs;
Directorate of African Affairs; and
Directorate of Asia-Pacific and African Intra- and Inter-regional Cooperation.
Directorate General of American and European Affairs, tasked with formulating and implementing Indonesian foreign policy in the form of bilateral, intraregional, and interregional interests in the region of the Americas and Europe.The DG oversees several subsections, as follows:
DG Secretariat;
Directorate of American Affairs I, in charge of North America;
Directorate of American Affairs II, in charge South America and the Caribbean;
Directorate of European Affairs I, in charge of Western and Southern Europe;
Directorate of European Affairs II, in charge of Northern, Central, and Eastern Europe; and
Directorate of European and American Intra- and Inter-regional Cooperation.
Directorate General of ASEAN Cooperation, tasked with formulating and implementing Indonesian foreign policy in the form of ASEAN cooperation. The DG oversees several subsections, as follows:
DG Secretariat;
Directorate of ASEAN Political and Security Cooperation;
Directorate of ASEAN Economic Cooperation;
Directorate of ASEAN Socio-cultural Cooperation; and
Directorate of ASEAN External Cooperation.
Directorate General of Multilateral Cooperation, tasked with formulating and implementing Indonesian foreign policy in the form of multilateral cooperation. The DG oversees several subsections, as follows:
DG Secretariat;
Directorate of International Security and Disarmament;
Directorate of Human Rights and Humanitarian Affairs;
Directorate of Development, Economic, and Environmental Affairs;
Directorate of Trade, Industry, Commodities, and Intellectual Property; and
Directorate of Socio-cultural Affairs and International Organizations of Developing Countries.
Directorate General of Law and International Treaty, tasked with formulating and implementing Indonesian foreign policy in the form of international law and international treaties enforcement. The DG oversees several subsections, as follows:
DG Secretariat;
Directorate of Legal Affairs and Territorial Treaties;
Directorate of Legal Affairs and Economic Treaties;
Directorate of Legal Affairs and Socio-cultural Treaties; and
Directorate of Legal Affairs and Political and Security Treaties.
Directorate General of Information and Public Diplomacy, tasked with formulating and implementing Indonesian foreign policy in the form of information management, public diplomacy, diplomatic security, and international development cooperation. The DG oversees several subsections, as follows:
DG Secretariat;
Directorate of Information and Media Services;
Directorate of Public Diplomacy;
Directorate of International Development Cooperation; and
Directorate of Diplomatic Security. 
Directorate General of Protocol and Consular Affairs, tasked with formulating and implementing Indonesian foreign policy in the form of providing protocol service, consular service, diplomatic facilities, as well as protecting Indonesian citizens overseas. The DG oversees several subsections, as follows:
DG Secretariat;
Directorate of Protocol Affairs;
Directorate of Consular Affairs;
Directorate of Diplomatic Facilities; and
Directorate of Protection of Citizens.

Inspectorate 
Inspectorate General, tasked with internal monitoring of the Ministry and the Missions. The Inspectorate General oversees several subsections, as follows:
Secretariat of the Inspectorate General;
Regional Inspectorate I (Indonesian missions in Southeast Asia, East Asia, South and Central Asia, Indonesian permanent representative for ASEAN, as well as Directorate General of Asia-Pacific and African Affairs, Directorate General of ASEAN Cooperation, and Foreign Policy Strategy Agency);
Regional Inspectorate II (Indonesian missions in Europe, as well as Directorate General of American and European Affairs, Directorate General of Multilateral Cooperation, and Directorate General of Legal and International Treaties);
Regional Inspectorate III (Indonesian missions in Africa, Middle East, as well as the Secretariat General and the Inspectorate General); and
Regional Inspectorate IV (Indonesian missions in Pacific, the Americas, the Caribbean, as well as Directorate General of Information and Public Diplomacy, Directorate General of Protocol and Consular Affairs, Education and Training Center, IT and Communications Center, and Functionary Management Center).

Agency 
Foreign Policy Strategy Agency, tasked with tasked with formulating, drafting, and providing recommendation on Indonesian foreign policy strategy. The agency is coordinated under the Secretariat General and oversees several centers, as follows:
Agency Secretariat;
Center for Policy Strategy for the Asia-Pacific and Africa Region;
Center for Policy Strategy for the Americas and Europe Region;
Center for Multilateral Policy Strategy; and
Center for Policy Strategy for Special Issues and Data Analysis.

Advisory Staff 
Advisor to the Minister on Political, Legal, and Security Affairs, tasked with providing recommendation on strategic issues to the Minister on matters of politics, law, and security;
Advisor to the Minister on Economic Diplomacy, tasked with providing recommendation on strategic issues to the Minister on matters of economic diplomacy;
Advisor to the Minister on Socio-Cultural Affairs and Indonesian Overseas Empowerment, tasked with providing recommendation on strategic issues to the Minister on matters of socio-cultural affairs and the empowerment of overseas Indonesian;
Advisor to the Minister on Inter-Institutional Relations, tasked with providing recommendation on strategic issues to the Minister on matters of interinstitutional relations;
Advisor to the Minister on Management, tasked with providing recommendation on strategic issues to the Minister on matters of organizational management; and
Special Advisor to the Minister on Priority Programs, tasked with providing recommendation on strategic issues to the Minister on matters of priority programs.

Centers 
The following centers is coordinated under the Secretariat General:
Education and Training Center, tasked with formulating technical policy, implementing, monitoring, evaluating, managing of learning support facilities, and reporting on matters of training and educating civil servants of the Ministry and the Missions. The Center oversees several subsections, as follows:
Planning, Development, and Evaluation Section;
Non-diplomatic Education and Training Section;
Technical Education and Training Section;
Education and Training Cooperation Section; and
Administrative Affairs Section.
IT and Communications Center for the Ministry and Missions, tasked with formulating technical policy, implementing, monitoring, evaluating, and reporting on IT and Communications development and management, diplomatic digital data, integrated communication system, information security management, and diplomatic cyphers, within the Ministry and the Missions. The Center oversees several subsections, as follows:
IT and Communications Management Section;
IT and Communications Development Section;
IT and Communications Operation Sections; and 
Administrative Affairs Section.
Functionary Management Center, tasked with formulating technical policy, implementing, monitoring, evaluating, and reporting on functionary management within the Ministry. The Center oversees several subsections, as follows:
Diplomat Fostering Section;
Chancellery Administrator and Non-diplomatic Functionary I Fostering Section;
Diplomatic Information Administrator and Non-diplomatic Functionary II Fostering Section; and
Administrative Affairs Section.

Technical Units 

 Junior Diplomatic School, also known as UPT Sekdilu, organized under the Education and Training Center;
 Mid-career Diplomatic School, also known as UPT Sesdilu, organized under the Education and Training Center;
 Senior Diplomatic School, also known as UPT Sesparlu, organized under the Education and Training Center; and
 Asian-African Conference Museum or Museum KAA, organized under the Directorate of Public Diplomacy.

Diplomats

Diplomatic ranks 
In Indonesia, the professional term "Diplomat" refers to a specific functionary post within the Indonesian Civil Service. Diplomatic ranks for Indonesian diplomats were modified in order to accommodate the classification for Indonesian Civil Service regulations.

Education and training 
Professional diplomats of the Foreign Ministry are part of the Indonesian Civil Service, and thus trained and educated by the Ministry after passing the National Civil Service Examination and completing the National Civil Service Basic Training Program. The Foreign Ministry's Education and Training Center offers three education and training programs for diplomats to participate in:

 Junior Diplomatic School (abbreviated as Sekdilu), aimed for diplomat candidates to rise to junior diplomats;
 Mid-career Diplomatic School (abbreviated as Sesdilu), aimed for junior diplomats to rise to mid-career diplomats; and
 Senior Diplomatic School (abbreviated as Sesparlu), aimed for mid-career diplomats to rise to senior diplomats, in order to fill in key leadership positions in the Ministry and Missions.

Foreign Ministry Building Complex 
The Foreign Ministry Building Complex is located on No. 6 Taman Pejambon Street in Central Jakarta. It is built around the historic Gedung Pancasila, which used to host the Dutch colonial assembly (the Volksraad) and the BPUPK committee during the Japanese occupation, as well as the Gedung Garuda next door, which used to host the Council of the Indies (the Raad van Indie).

The ministry also maintained several off-site locations, such as the Education and Training Center complex in Senayan, South Jakarta. The Societeit Concordia Bandung, better known as the Asian-African Conference Museum or the Merdeka Building in Bandung, is also maintained and organized under the ministry.

1971 Construction 
The construction of current modern structures first began on 7 January 1971 during the tenure of Foreign Minister Adam Malik. The buildings were designed by a team of architects from Perentjana Djaja. During this phase, four different structure was refurbished or completed:

 a 10-story main operational building, completed in 1975;
 a west-wing building used by ASEAN National Secretariat, completed in 1972;
 an east-wing building, previously occupied by BP7 government institution, used for the library and executive offices, completed in 1974;
 the Gedung Pancasila, which was originally built in 1830, underwent a renovation in 1973 and completed in 1975. 
 a dome-shaped fifth structure, which was planned to serve as a meeting hall, was scrapped early.

By 1975, all construction and refurbishment project has been completed. The project was jointly executed by PT. Hutama Karya and PT. Moeladi, with a budget of IDR 2.5 billion per August 1972. President Soeharto and Foreign Minister Adam Malik officially inaugurate the Foreign Ministry Building Complex on 19 August 1975, the 30th Anniversary of the Ministry of Foreign Affairs.

1988 Fire 
On the early hours of 10 November 1988, a fire broke out in the East Wing and the Main Building. Firefighters managed to put the fire under control in an hour, with around ten offices heavily damaged. Several agendas of the Ministry have to move their venue or be cancelled.

1991 Renovation 
Following the 1988 fire, several Foreign Ministry units and personnel were forced to work in separate office for some times, such as in Sam Ratulangi office (Menteng) or in Sisingamangaraja office (Kebayoran Baru), which resulted with disturbances and disorganized workflow within the Ministry.

In order to address this issue, a major renovation is planned, with PT. Pasaraya Tosersajaya assigned as the project developer; designs inspired by the original 1970s draft by Perentjana Djaja team were implemented by a team of architects of Parama Loka Consultants. A special attention and consideration was made during designing phase to properly present the Gedung Pancasila as the face of the Ministry. The renovated building would be painted white, rather than the previous light brown.

The renovation was executed by private contractor Total Bangun Persada, with an estimated budget of IDR 40 billion. It began in May 1991 with the cleanup of the fire-damaged East Wing and completed by August 1992, and inaugurated by President Soeharto on 19 August 1992, the 47th Anniversary of the Ministry, and just before the opening of 1992 Non-Aligned Movement Summit in Jakarta.

Recent development 
On March 2021, the renovation for Integrated Public Service Building is completed and inaugurated by Foreign Minister Retno Marsudi.

The Foreign Ministry will be one of the first government ministries to be moved to the new capital in Nusantara, with asset and personnel transfer might happen as early as 2024.

List of diplomatic and consular missions 

The Ministry of Foreign Affairs currently maintains 132 diplomatic and consular missions overseas, which consist of:

 95 embassies (abbreviated to KBRI);
 30 consulates-general (abbreviated to KJRI);
 4 consulates (abbreviated to KRI); and
 3 permanent representatives (abbreviated to PTRI) for the United Nations (New York City and Geneva) and for ASEAN (Jakarta).

List of foreign ministers

See also

 Foreign relations of Indonesia

Literature

References

External links
 Ministry of Foreign Affairs 

Indonesia
F